Édouard-Jean Réquin (13 July 1879, in Rouen – 1953) was a French military officer.

Through 1900 to 1911 he was part of an expedition to North Africa. Then in 1916-1918 a member of the General Staff of Marshals Joseph Joffre and Ferdinand Foch. It is at this time that a portrait of Réquin in military uniform was made by Kees van Dongen in 1916. From 1917-1918, as a Lieutenant Colonel, he was part of the French military delegation to Washington, D. C. In the summer of 1918 he promoted the French Army's policy of racial integration. American military officials were impressed by Réquin's depiction of the situation in the French Army where whites and blacks served side by side and were cared for in the same hospitals and by the same personnel; they had his report La Course de l'Amérique à la Victoire published in English as America's race to victory (1919). In 1919 he was a technical counsellor at Versailles Peace Conference, and later author of Projet de Traité d'Assistance Mutuelle (1924). From 1930 he was French Military Representative at the League of Nations, and 1930-1932 Chief of Cabinet of Ministry of War.

In 1938 he became a member of France's Supreme War Council, then In World War II he was a general, from 2 September 1939 to 6 July 1940 he commanded the 4th French Army against the German invasion of France.

In 1941 he retired, and in 1945 became President of the Société de la Légion d'Honneur. He published three further works: Combats pour l'Honneur, a study on General Louis Archinard in the Sudan, Archinard et le Soudan (both 1946) and his memoirs D'une guerre à l'autre 1919-1939 (1949).

References

External links
 Generals website Édouard-Jean Réquin photo

1879 births
1953 deaths
French military personnel of World War I
French military personnel of World War II
French generals